Tunde Adeleye, the Diocesan Bishop of Calabar, is the Archbishop of the  Anglican Province of the Niger Delta, one of 14 within the Church of Nigeria.

His past posts include:
 President, Christian Union, Mid-Western Polytechnic 
 President, Christian Union University of Calabar
 National coordinator, Nigeria Christian Graduate Fellowship 
 Chairman, Haggai Institute for Advanced Leadership Training 
 Chairman, Christian Council of Nigeria
 Chaplain, All Saints Chapel, University of Benin
 Chairman, Divine Commonwealth Conference

Notes

University of Calabar alumni
University of Benin (Nigeria) people
Living people
Anglican bishops of Calabar
21st-century Anglican bishops in Nigeria
Anglican archbishops of Niger Delta
21st-century Anglican archbishops
Year of birth missing (living people)